Helmut Nowak (20 January 1938 – 23 February 2020) was a Polish footballer. He played in two matches for the Poland national football team from 1956 to 1957.

References

External links
 

1938 births
2020 deaths
Polish footballers
Poland international footballers
Place of birth missing
Association footballers not categorized by position